Hoseynabad (also Romanized as Ḩoseynābād; also known as Ḩoseynābād-e Āqā and Husainābād) is a village in Dodangeh Rural District, in the Central District of Behbahan County, Khuzestan Province, Iran. At the 2006 census, its population was 269, in 47 families.

References 

Populated places in Behbahan County